Nauset Light Beach is a one-mile-long beach on the east coast of outer Cape Cod in Eastham, Massachusetts. It is part of Cape Cod National Seashore.  Historic Nauset Light, which visitors can tour, is just inland from the beach. It is one mile north from Coast Guard Beach.

The beach is backed by massive sand dunes which results in steep stairs down to the beautiful sandy beach. It is a very popular beach (the parking lot can fill by 10 a.m.) and often has large waves great for surfing and bodyboarding. 

Restrooms and bathhouse are open seasonally.

References

External links

 Nauset Light Beach National Park Service 

Cape Cod National Seashore
Eastham, Massachusetts
Beaches of Massachusetts
Landforms of Barnstable County, Massachusetts
Tourist attractions in Barnstable County, Massachusetts